Khaneh Beygi (also Romanized as Khāneh Beygī; also known as Khāneh Begī) is a village in Chaqa Narges Rural District, Mahidasht District, Kermanshah County, Kermanshah Province, Iran. At the 2006 census, its population was 60, in 14 families.

References 

Populated places in Kermanshah County